Valea Baciului may refer to the following rivers in Romania:

 Valea Baciului, a tributary of the Sodol in Caraș-Severin County
 Baciu (Olt), in Covasna County, Romania
 Valea Baciului, in Constanța County, Romania